Zepol is a subscription-based service founded by Paul Rasmussen and Jeff Wilson in Edina, Minnesota. It provides access to U.S. trade data tools based on information from U.S. Customs, other government sources, and information gathered from vessel manifests filed at various ports.

References

Organizations based in Minneapolis
Organizations established in 2002
2002 establishments in Minnesota